Alfred Iverson may refer to:

Alfred Iverson, Sr., U.S. Senator from Georgia
Alfred Iverson, Jr., Confederate general during the American Civil War